Tarzan and the Valley of Gold is a 1966 Eastmancolor adventure film starring Mike Henry in his debut as Tarzan. The Panavision film, produced by Sy Weintraub, written by Clair Huffaker, and directed by Robert Day, is remembered for its very James Bond-like portrayal of a tropical suited, globetrotting Tarzan. It was released on July 1, 1966.

The novelization by Fritz Leiber was the first authorised Tarzan novel by an author other than Edgar Rice Burroughs, and was officially the 25th book in the series.

Plot
Augustus Vinero is a wealthy international criminal known for his habit of sending explosive wristwatches or necklaces to those not in his favor. When he hears of Ramel, a small boy who may know the location of the fabled Valley of Gold in Mexico, he sends a death squad of plainclothes mercenaries which destroys the farmhouse (and its inhabitants) where Ramel is being sheltered.

Prior to his murder, the head of the farmhouse summoned his old friend Tarzan to track the kidnappers and rescue the boy. Aware of Tarzan's arrival, Vinero uses one of his assassins to impersonate a taxi driver to meet Tarzan at the airport. Tarzan is driven to an ambush in an empty stadium. After the driver is killed, Tarzan kills the sniper by crushing him with a giant Coca-Cola bottle used in the stadium for advertising.

The local authorities take Tarzan to the boy's wrecked compound and offer Tarzan troops, technology and weapons for his mission. Tarzan turns them down in favor of his own equipment: a chimpanzee scout called Dinky, a lion named Major, Ramel's pet leopard, his hunting knife and his uniform of a loincloth.

Meanwhile, Vinero and his private army are heading for the lost city in two separate parties, one led by Vinero and the other party has Ramel. Vinero's uniformed private army is well equipped with American World War II small arms, an M5A1 Stuart light tank, an M3 Half-track and a Bell 47 helicopter. Tarzan catches up with Ramel's party, the leopard is killed and Tarzan kills Vinero's thugs. Tarzan calls Vinero on a walkie-talkie and tells him what has happened and warns Vinero not to continue, Vinero sends a helicopter which Tarzan, using a captured M1919 Browning machine gun (that he fires from the hip but misses) and then a bolus of Mk 2 grenades, brings down.

Vinero had forced Sophia Renault, his mistress, to stay with him, but now he no longer needs her and leaves her in the bush with an explosive pendant round her neck. Tarzan finds her and removes the pendant. Ramel tells Tarzan that Sophia helped him escape. Tarzan, Sophia, Ramel, Major and Dinky head for the City of Gold.

Ignoring Tarzan's warning, Vinero's army have discovered the entrance to the Valley of Gold through a cave, previously described by Ramel. Tarzan's party arrives at the same cave. Tarzan sends the others on to warn the city's inhabitants, tracks Vinero's men in the cave entrance to the lost city and further demonstrates his expertise in weaponry by wiping out Vinero's rear guard ambush party by crushing them with stalactites hanging over them which he shoots down with a captured M1918 Browning Automatic Rifle. Vinero retreats to the cave entrance.

Tarzan goes into the city and finds that the city people are proposing to do nothing because they are too peaceful. Vinero meantime blasts a wider path through the cave and brings their vehicles to the valley. The chief says he will give away all the gold rather than lose a single life and then locks Tarzan in a room to stop him fighting. Upon arrival in the peaceful city (Tukamay), Vinero demands all the gold in the city and provides motivation by having his tank shell the buildings which kills several of the city's inhabitants. Vinero says he will return for all the gold and to meet the chief's other guest 'from Africa'.

Tarzan, now released, persuades the chief to give up all the gold and get everyone out of the city. All the gold is put in a pile in the center of the now deserted city. However, the Chief (Manco) lets slip that there is only one more piece of gold left. Vinero has his troops start to load the halftrack up with the gold and orders the chief to take him to the last piece of gold or else more lives will be lost. From a room full of junk, Vinero goes through a door, apparently made of solid gold, and starts to inspect the room which has gold dust on the floor.

Meanwhile, Tarzan gets into the tank. The loaded halftrack is being driven away but Tarzan eliminates the remainder of the army (except for the main henchman, Mr. Train), by expertly using the cannon of the tank on the halftrack and the army. As Vinero eagerly attempts to pull a golden ornament off the wall, the ceiling releases enough gold dust to fill the room and smother him, at the same time as Tarzan fights and defeats Vinero's hulking Oddjob-type henchman, Mr. Train.

With the threat from Vinero's army ended, Tarzan and Sophia leave the Valley of Gold and return to the outside civilization.

Selected Cast
 Mike Henry as Tarzan
 David Opatoshu as Augustus Vinero, international villain
 Manuel Padilla Jr. as Ramel, a kidnapped boy. Padilla Jr. would also play Jai opposite Ron Ely in NBC's television series
 Nancy Kovack as Sophia Renault, Tarzan's ally
 Don Megowan as Mr. Train, Vinero's hulking henchman
 Enrique Lucero as Perez
 Edwardo Noriega as Insp. Talmadge
 John Kelly as Captain Voss
 Francisco Riquerio as Mango
 Frank Brandstetter as Ruiz
 Carlos Rivas as Romulo
 Jorge Beirute as Rodriguez
 Oswald Olvera as Antonio

Production notes
This was filmed entirely on location in Mexico – near Acapulco, at Mexico City's Plaza de Toros, at the Chapultepec Castle, the Teotihuacan ruins, and in the caves at Guerrero.

Nancy Kovack replaced Sharon Tate in the role of Sophia Renault just before filming began in 1965. Tate can be seen with Henry in publicity stills that were published in newspapers when the film was announced.

Early drafts of the script were entitled, Tarzan and the Treasure of Tucumai and Tarzan '66.

DVD
Tarzan and the Valley of Gold was released by Warner Home Video in a DVD on 20 April 2010, as part of their Warner Archives DVD-on-demand collection.

Novel

The Edgar Rice Burroughs estate chose Fritz Leiber to write an authorised novel based on Huffaker's screenplay. Leiber's novel was released in paperback by Ballantine Books in April 1966, and features an expanded version of the film's story with footnotes detailing connections to Tarzan's past adventures as chronicled by Burroughs. An ebook edition was issued by Gateway/Orion in August 2013, and a hardcover edition illustrated by Richard Hescox by Edgar Rice Burroughs, Inc. in August 2019.

References

Sources

External links
 
 
 
 
 ERBzine Silver Screen: Tarzan and the Valley of Gold

1966 films
1960s fantasy adventure films
1966 fantasy novels
American sequel films
American International Pictures films
Films directed by Robert Day
Films set in 1966
Films set in Mexico
Films shot in Mexico
Tarzan films
American fantasy adventure films
Films produced by Sy Weintraub
1960s English-language films
1960s American films